Saula Ma'u (born 29 April 2000) is a New Zealand rugby union player who plays for the  in Super Rugby. His playing position is prop. He was named in the Highlanders squad for the 2022 Super Rugby Pacific season. He was also a member of the  2021 Bunnings NPC squad.

References

External links

2000 births
New Zealand rugby union players
Living people
Rugby union props
Otago rugby union players
Highlanders (rugby union) players